Jens William Ægidius Elling (also Aegidus  or Aegidius) (26 July 1861 – 27 May 1949) was a Norwegian  researcher, inventor and pioneer of gas turbines who is considered to be the father of the gas turbine. He built the first gas turbine that was able to produce more power than needed to run its own components.

Elling was born in and grew up in Oslo, Norway.   He studied mechanical engineering at Kristiania Technical College, (now part of Oslo and Akershus University College of Applied Sciences)  graduating in 1881. Between 1885 and 1902, he worked as an engineer and designer at a number of workshops in Sweden and Norway.

His first gas turbine patent was granted in 1884.

In 1903 he completed the first turbine that produced excess power; his original machine used both rotary compressors and turbines to produce  net. He further developed the concept, and by 1912 he had developed a gas turbine system with separate turbine unit and compressor in series, a combination that is now common.   

One major challenge was to find materials that could withstand the high temperatures developed in the turbine to achieve high output powers. His 1903 turbine could withstand inlet temperatures up to 400° Celsius (752° F). Elling understood that if better materials could be found, the gas turbine would be an ideal power source for airplanes. Many years later, Sir Frank Whittle, building on the early work of Elling, managed to build a practical gas turbine engine for an airplane, the jet engine. His gas turbine prototypes from 1903 and 1912 are exhibited at Norsk Teknisk Museum in Oslo.

Elling also did significant development work in other areas, such as steam engine controls, pumps, compressors, vacuum drying et cetera.

In 1914 Elling produced a book called Billig opvarmning: veiledning i at behandle magasinovner økonomisk og letvint. , which was published by Aschehoug. Books written by Elling are now rare, and are mostly found in museums and libraries.

References

External links

Norwegian Technical Museum's biography of Elling (Norwegian)

1861 births
1949 deaths
Jet engine pioneers
Norwegian inventors